BSSP or Bssp may refer to:

 Butler, Shine, Stern & Partners (BSSP), an American advertising agency 
 Brooklyn South Safety Patrol, American neighborhood watch group, otherwise known as Brooklyn South Shomrim
 Beijing Sponsors and Supporters Program (BSSP), an Australian program connected with the 2008 Summer Paralympics
 Bssp, an alias for the Kallikrein-6 protein, encoded by the KLK6 gene in humans

See also
 BSSP-4, an alias for the human gene PRSS22